Asa Baber (June 19, 1936 – June 16, 2003) was an American author, former Marine, and columnist for Playboy.

Growing up on the South Side of Chicago, Baber was involved in several incidents of petty mischief before his grandmother arranged for him to attend the Lawrenceville Academy, a prestigious boarding school in New Jersey. Baber went on to Princeton University where he joined the United States Marine Corps Platoon Leader Corps. After graduation in 1958, he was commissioned and served in the Marine Corps until 1961, achieving the rank of Captain, and participating in several covert actions in Laos. His military experience became material for several essays and, finally, his first book, Land of a Million Elephants, published in 1971, and serialized in Playboy. Baber performed his graduate work at Northwestern University and the University of Iowa's Writer's Workshop. From 1969 through 1975 Baber was a professor of English at the University of Hawaii. He was so beloved that, when the Chicago Sun-Times published an article about him in 2002 (focusing largely on his failing health), dozens of former students wrote to him to re-establish contact and offer support.

In 1978, Baber wrote an essay called, "Who Gets Screwed In A Divorce? I Do!" which was published in Playboy. The essay was so popular that Baber joined with longtime Playboy editor Arthur Ketchmer to develop a column called "Men", that became a celebrated cornerstone of Men's liberation. Quickly becoming one of the magazine's most popular features, the unapologetic and politically incorrect column covered a broad spectrum of subjects including sports, sexuality, divorce, male-bashing, employment, personal identity, fatherhood, and personal values.

In September 2001, Baber was diagnosed with amyotrophic lateral sclerosis (ALS), also known as Lou Gehrig's disease. (Coincidentally, Baber shared a birthday with his hero, Lou Gehrig.) Upon making an announcement on the 2002 Jerry Lewis MDA Telethon, Baber was elected to serve as national president of the Muscular Dystrophy Association, a post he held until his death. His final column, published the month of his death, retained his gritty style and displayed the quintessentially masculine courage with which he faced his disease.

External links

 Playboy Columnist ManTalk Interview Part 1 
 Chicago Sun-Time June 18, 2003; " Asa Baber, 66, wrote Playboy's 'Men' column 
 Asa Baber, 66; Brought Male Perspective to Playboy Column 
 Los Angeles Times, "Asa Baber, 66, Wrote Playboy Magazine's Long-Running 'Men' Column"
"Chicago Writer Elected to National MDA Leadership"

1936 births
2003 deaths
Princeton University alumni
United States Marine Corps officers
Northwestern University alumni
University of Iowa alumni
University of Hawaiʻi faculty
American columnists
Playboy people
Neurological disease deaths in Illinois
Deaths from motor neuron disease
Writers from Chicago
American expatriates in Laos
Military personnel from Illinois